Christine Papali'i (born 30 July 1962) is a former New Zealand rugby union player. She played for the Black Ferns and Auckland. She made her debut for New Zealand against the California Grizzlies at Christchurch on 22 July 1989.

Papali'i featured at RugbyFest 1990 against the Netherlands, the United States and a World XV. She also played club rugby for Ponsonby.

Personal life 
Papali'i is the mother of Phoenix Karaka who plays for the Silver Ferns.

References 

1962 births
Living people
New Zealand female rugby union players
New Zealand women's international rugby union players